Kim Criswell (born July 19, 1957) is an American musical entertainer and actress.

Life and career 
Criswell was born in Hampton, Virginia, United States, and grew up in Chattanooga, Tennessee. After she graduated from Hixson High School in suburban Chattanooga, she studied musical theatre at the University of Cincinnati's College Conservatory of Music. She then moved to New York City where she landed a role in the touring company of Annie. She made her Broadway debut in The First in 1981.  She has been in numerous musicals and has appeared with some of America's leading symphony orchestras as the featured soloist. She won the Helen Hayes Award in 1989 for her 1988 performance in Side By Side By Sondheim at the Olney Theatre in Washington.

In September 1991, she presented her one-woman show Doin What Comes Naturally, at the Shaw Theatre in London. She has lived in London since 1992, when she was invited to play Annie Oakley in Irving Berlin's musical Annie Get Your Gun.

On August 1, 2009, she was a featured soloist in the "BBC Proms 2009: a Celebration of Classic MGM Film Musicals" at the Royal Albert Hall. On that evening she performed a number of songs including: "The Trolley Song", "Over the Rainbow" and "Get Happy" all originally made famous by Judy Garland. She additionally performed the songs "I Got Rhythm" (also in Garland's repertoire) and "Who Wants to Be a Millionaire" in a duet with Seth MacFarlane.  On October 4, 2009, she was a featured artist at the Broadway to West End Gala in the Theatre Royal Drury Lane. She repeated her Proms Concert success when she appeared in a Rodgers and Hammerstein evening, once again with the John Wilson Orchestra at The Royal Albert Hall with opera singer Rod Gilfry in August 2010.

In January 2012, she performed at Vienna's Volksoper, starring in Bernstein's Candide.

Musicals 
The First (1981) as Hilda/ensemble
Nine (1982) as Francesca (also as Claudia-first replacement)
Baby (1983) as Narrator/Sixth Woman
Jesus Christ Superstar at Papermill Playhouse as Mary Magdalene
Cats (1985-1986 LA Production) as Grizabella
Stardust (1986) as Soloist
Three Musketeers (1983) as Queen Anne
Side By Side By Sondheim (1988)
The Threepenny Opera (1989) at Lunt Fontanne Theatre, Broadway as Lucy Brown
Annie Get Your Gun (1992) at Prince Of Wales Theatre, London as Annie Oakley
I Married an Angel at Theatre Off Park as Peggy
Dames at Sea (1996) as Mona Kent
The Slow Drag (1997) as June Wedding
Of Thee I Sing (1998) as Diana Deaveraux
Wonderful Town (1999) as Ruth Sherwood
Hollywood and Broadway II -Herself, Bonnie Langford& Wayne Sleep- 1993Anything Goes (2002) at Grange Park Opera as Reno SweeneyCall Me Madam (2004) at Goodspeed Opera House as Mrs. Sally AdamsInto The Woods (2006) as The WitchCandide (2006) at the Théâtre du Châtelet (Paris - France) as The Old WomanThe Sound of Music (2009) at the Théâtre du Châtelet (Paris - France) as The Mother AbbessHysteria (2011) as Mrs. Castellari Carrie (2015) at the Southwark Playhouse (London) as Margaret White

FilmsThe Man Who Made Husbands Jealous (1997) as Georgie Maguire

 Recordings 
 "Dearest Enemy" (2012) 
Mary Murray

 Solo albums The Human Cry (1993)The Lorelei (1994)Back to Before (1999)Something to Dance About''

References

External links 
 Interview with Kim Criswell
 

1957 births
Living people
University of Cincinnati – College-Conservatory of Music alumni